New York's 30th State Senate district is one of 63 districts in the New York State Senate. It has been represented by Democrat Cordell Cleare since 2021.

Geography
District 30 is primarily based in Harlem in northern Manhattan, but also includes portions of East Harlem, the Upper West Side, Morningside Heights, Hamilton Heights, and Washington Heights.

The district overlaps with New York's 10th, 12th, and 13th congressional districts, and with the 67th, 68th, 69th, 70th, 71st, and 72nd districts of the New York State Assembly.

Recent election results

2021 special

2020

2018

2017 special

2016

2014

2012

Federal results in District 30

References

30